Taman Midah (formerly known as Bolton Garden) is a 262-acre township in Cheras, Kuala Lumpur, Malaysia. The township probably takes its name from the Midah River which flows into a small lake to the east.

Location
Taman Midah is located 5 kilometers from Bukit Bintang in the centre of Kuala Lumpur. Its north-eastern boundary is formed by the main trunk road of Jalan Cheras, the south-eastern by the Kuala Lumpur Middle Ring Road 2. To its west is the Pusat Perubatan Universiti Kebangsaan Malaysia and the peaceful spaces of Taman Tasik Permaisuri (Lake Park). Running through the centre of the township is Jalan Midah Besar.

History
The area was originally a rubber plantation known as the Bolton Estate. Originally an independent plantation, it was acquired by Bukit Kepong Estates Ltd on January 1, 1925. The company went into voluntary liquidation in 1964, after which the land was sold for development. 
Between the 1970s and 1990s the land was developed as one of Kuala Lumpur's first townships by Bolton Berhad (now known as Symphony Life Berhad).

Character
Taman Midah is predominantly a residential township with a small number of commercial units. Some roads are characterised by late twentieth century link houses. Others feature expensive large detached homes (bungalows). There are also a small number of condominium complexes.

Sports and Recreational
Taman Tasik Permaisuri (Lake Park) is popular with joggers/runners from nearby areas. Both the Stadium Bolasepak Kuala Lumpur and Kompleks Renang Kuala Lumpur are adjacent to the park.

Health
Pusat Perubatan Universiti Kebangsaan Malaysia and Cheras Rehabilitation Hospital are located nearby along Jalan Yaacob Latif.

Shopping
Taman Midah has a range of traditional shops and a large Tesco supermarket. There is a morning market daily and a pasar malam each Saturday. Nearby are the increasingly popular shopping and eating areas of Cheras, including the Cheras Leisure Mall and, newly opened in 2019, the EkoCheras Mall.

Connectivity
Taman Midah is well connected by both road and public transport links. Since 17 July 2017 it has been served by its  own MRT station on the  Kajang Line.  Bandar Tun Razak LRT station on the  Sri Petaling Line is located a short distance away. Also nearby is  Salak Selatan LRT station on the  Sri Petaling Line (planned future interchange with MRT Circle Line), as well as  Salak Selatan KTM Komuter station on the  KTM Komuter Seremban Line.

The major highways connecting the township are East–West Link Expressway (Salak Expressway), Kuala Lumpur Middle Ring Road 2, Cheras-Kajang Expressway and Shah Alam Expressway.

Links
Taman Midah boundaries on Google Maps.

References

Suburbs in Kuala Lumpur